Michael "Mick" Fanning is an Irish Gaelic footballer for Louth. who plays for his local club, Naomh Máirtín.

He plays Centre Back for the Louth senior inter-county team since making his senior debut in 2006. In 2011 it was announced that Fanning was to emigrate to Australia in search of work alongside his teammates John O'Brien and Brian White. He however returned in the summer but never gained his starting place for the Wee County.

References

External links
 

Year of birth missing (living people)
Living people
Louth inter-county Gaelic footballers
Naomh Mairtin (Louth) Gaelic footballers